Sanjay E. Sarma (born May 1968) an Indian mechanical engineer who is the Fred Fort Flowers (1941) and Daniel Fort Flowers (1941) professor of mechanical engineering and the Vice President for Open Learning at Massachusetts Institute of Technology.  He is credited with developing many standards and technologies in the commercial RFID industry. Sarma is co-author of The Inversion Factor: How to Thrive in the IOT Economy (MIT Press, 2017), along with Linda Bernardi and the late Kenneth Traub.  Sarma also serves on the board of the MOOC provider edX as a representative of MIT.

Early life
Sarma earned his B.Tech. in Mechanical Engineering from Indian Institute of Technology, Kanpur in 1989, his ME from Carnegie Mellon University in 1992 and his Ph.D. from University of California, Berkeley in 1995.

Personal life
Sarma is the son of the former Secretary, Government of India, Dr. E. A. S. Sarma, respected and recognized for his works for various social causes as also for his contributions in Energy sector. He is married to Dr. Gitanjali Swamy, daughter of Dr. Subramanian Swamy, an Indian politician. They have one daughter.

Career
Sarma began his career at Massachusetts Institute of Technology in 1996, after working for Schlumberger, Inc. and Lawrence Berkeley Laboratories.

Sarma and Dr. David Brock began work on RFID in 1998. In 1999, he co-founded the Auto-ID center at MIT together with Prof. Sunny Siu and Dr. David Brock of MIT, and Kevin Ashton of P&G in order to make the vision of standards based RFID a commercial reality. The center opened in 1999 as an industry sponsored, MIT research project with the express goal of creating a global open standard system to put RFID everywhere Auto-ID Center. When Siu departed, Sarma served as the research director and then the chairman of research. Under Sarma's leadership with Kevin Ashton, the number of sponsors grew to 103, and additional labs were funded at other major universities around the world. Once the EPC System was developed, MIT licensed it to non-profit standards body GS1 to create EPCglobal, and the Auto-ID Center project reached a successful conclusion.  The center was renamed Auto-ID Labs and continue their research.

The Auto ID Labs helped standardize RFID technologies and laid the groundwork for the Internet of Things (IOT). Sarma is co-author of The Inversion Factor: How to Thrive in the IOT Economy (MIT Press, 2017) along with Linda Bernardi and the late Kenneth Traub. The book charts the evolution of three IoTs—the Internet of Things (devices connected to the Internet), the Intelligence of Things (devices that host software applications), and the Innovation of Things (devices that become experiences).

Sarma is founder of the company IoTask, which provides consulting and advisory services on establishing and standardizing internet of things systems across a number of industry sectors. Prof. Sarma is a frequent industry speaker and serves on the board of governors of EPCglobal and GS1 US, and as a permanent guest of GS1. He serves on the board of Hochschild Mining, as well as technical advisor and board member to Top Flight Technologies. From 2012 to 2014 he served as the chairman of the board of EPCglobal. He also served as CTO and director (board member) of OATSystems, a leader in the RFID market. OATSystems was acquired in 2008 by Checkpoint Systems.

Sarma is a recipient of the National Science Foundation CAREER Award, the Cecil and Ida Green Career Development Chair at MIT, the Den Hartog Award for Excellence in Teaching, the Keenan Award for Innovations in Undergraduate Education, the MacVicar Fellowship and the New England Business and Technology Award. He was named as Business Week's 'e.biz 25 Innovators' list and Information Week's "Innovators and Influencers".  In 2010 he received the inaugural RFID Journal Special Achievement Award. He has over 50 publications in computational geometry, virtual reality, manufacturing, CAD, RFID, security and embedded computing.

In his lectures on Dynamics (MIT Course 2.003) Sarma often refers to the "Magic Formula" and the "Super Magic Formula." Many of his lectures are available online. Sarma also teaches manufacturing. Sarma was also a member of the Production in an Innovation Economy Commission formed by MIT in 2011. The commission released two books.

In November 2012, Professor Sarma was appointed the first Director of Digital Learning at MIT with a mandate to assess how initiatives such as MITx and EdX are affecting instruction on campus. The MIT Office of Digital Learning, established in 2013, then included MITx and MIT's historic OpenCourseWare project. Sarma was later named Dean of Digital Learning, and in April 2013, Professor Sarma was appointed as a co-chair of the Task Force for the Future of Education at MIT. The Task Force published its final report in August 2014, delivering a series of recommendations for MIT's education on campus and beyond. Based on the report's recommendations, in February 2015, MIT President L. Rafael Reif announced a significant expansion of MIT's programs in learning research and online and digital education — from pre-kindergarten through higher education to lifelong learning.  In this announcement, Sarma was appointed vice president for Open Learning, where he now leads the Office of Open Learning which oversees MIT's digital learning initiatives like MITx and MIT OpenCourseWare, as well as new programs launched under Sarma's leadership including the MicroMasters Program, the MIT Integrated Learning Initiative (MTili) and Abdul Latif Jameel World Education Lab (J-WEL). Sarma's new book Grasp explores how to reinvent education based on his extensive experience on digital education and open learning.

References

External links
MIT profile
MIT Office of Open Learning
Sanjay Sarma's website

Living people
1968 births
Carnegie Mellon University College of Engineering alumni
IIT Kanpur alumni
Indian expatriates in the United States
Indian mechanical engineers
MIT School of Engineering faculty
Radio-frequency identification
UC Berkeley College of Engineering alumni